Ayanami, meaning  "twilled waves" in Japanese, may refer to:

Japanese destroyer Ayanami, the name of 3 ships
 Rei Ayanami, a fictional character from the Japanese media franchise Neon Genesis Evangelion
 Ayanami, a fictional character from the Japanese fantasy manga 07-Ghost